Elymana is a genus of true bugs belonging to the family Cicadellidae.

The species of this genus are found in Europe and Northern America.

Species:
 Elymana acuma DeLong, 1936
 Elymana caduca

References

Cicadellidae
Hemiptera genera